Charles Adolph Voigt (May 2, 1869 – July 3, 1929) was an American tennis player. He competed in the men's singles event at the 1900 Summer Olympics.

References

External links
 

1869 births
1929 deaths
American male tennis players
Olympic tennis players of the United States
Tennis players at the 1900 Summer Olympics
Sportspeople from San Jose, California
Tennis people from California